The 2020 Georgia Swarm season is the 5th season of the Georgia Swarm, a lacrosse team based in Duluth, Georgia playing in the National Lacrosse League. The team was formerly based in Saint Paul, Minnesota and was known as the Minnesota Swarm. Due to the COVID-19 pandemic, the season was suspended on March 12, 2020. On April 8, the league made a further public statement announcing the cancellation of the remaining games of the 2020 season and that they would be exploring options for playoffs once it was safe to resume play.

Regular season

Current standings

Game log

Game log

Roster

Entry Draft
The 2019 NLL Entry Draft took place on September 17, 2019. The Swarm made the following selections:

References

Georgia Swarm
Georgia Swarm
Georgia Swarm seasons